Mannequin Parade was an Australian television series, or possibly a highly unusual commercial break/TV show hybrid, which aired on Melbourne station GTV-9 from weekly on Saturdays 1 June 1957 to 24 May 1958.

In 1957, Darrods, a now-defunct department store, decided to sponsor two U.S. series, Cross Current and Mr. District Attorney. In-between the series was a locally produced 10-minute segment called Mannequin Parade, which was compered by model Gretta Miers, who was nicknamed "The Darrod Girl" on the series. Half-hour US series in those days ran 25 minutes minus the commercials, so the two programmes along with the 10 minute Mannequin Parade resulted in a 60-minute section of the GTV-9 schedule.

GTV-9 also presented another fashion show, called Lovely to Look At, during 1957.

References

External Links

Nine Network original programming
1957 Australian television series debuts
1958 Australian television series endings
Australian non-fiction television series
Black-and-white Australian television shows
English-language television shows
Fashion-themed television series